This is a list of the National Register of Historic Places listings in Polk County, Iowa.

This is intended to be a complete list of the properties and districts on the National Register of Historic Places in Polk County, Iowa, United States. Latitude and longitude coordinates are provided for many National Register properties and districts; these locations may be seen together in an online map.

There are 201 properties and districts listed on the National Register in the county, including 2 National Historic Landmarks. The city of Des Moines is the location of 186 of these properties and districts, including the 2 National Historic Landmarks; they are listed separately, while the remaining 15 properties and districts are listed here.

Current listings

Des Moines

Outside Des Moines

|}

See also
 List of National Historic Landmarks in Iowa
 National Register of Historic Places listings in Iowa
 Listings in neighboring counties: Boone, Dallas, Jasper, Madison, Marion, Story, Warren

References

 
Polk